The abbreviation LCPS may refer to:
 Las Cruces Public Schools, a school district
 Loudoun County Public Schools, a school district
 Lowndes County Public Schools (Alabama), a school district